Helston Community Hospital is a health facility in Helston, Cornwall, England. It is managed by Cornwall Partnership NHS Foundation Trust.

History
The facility, which was designed and built by E. H. Winn as a lasting memorial to soldiers who died in the First World War, was opened as the Helston Cottage Hospital on 21 May 1923. After joining the National Health Service in 1948, it became Helston Community Hospital in 2008. In June 2018, four beds were closed after a local GP withdrew his support from the hospital.

References

External links

Hospitals established in 1923
1923 establishments in England
Hospitals in Cornwall
Helston
NHS hospitals in England